The Orden del Pop (Order of the Mat) is an annual award bestowed by the Museo Popol Vuh at Guatemala's Universidad Francisco Marroquín. Created in 1998, the Orden del Pop recognises "the work of individuals who have made significant contributions towards the protection, study and research of Guatemala's cultural heritage".

Recipients
Source: UFM

See also

 List of history awards
 List of anthropology awards

References

External links
 Orden del Pop website, Museo Popol Vuh

Awards established in 1998
Guatemalan awards
Anthropology awards
History awards
Mesoamerican studies
Universidad Francisco Marroquín